Alfons De Bal (born 30 September 1943 in Geel) is a Belgian former road cyclist, who competed as a professional from 1963 to 1979. He most notably won the Druivenkoers Overijse in 1967.

Major results

1966
 2nd Circuit des Frontières
 6th Druivenkoers Overijse
1967
 1st Druivenkoers Overijse
 2nd Omloop der Zennevallei
 3rd De Kustpijl
 3rd Grote 1-MeiPrijs
 7th Kampioenschap van Vlaanderen
 7th Tour du Condroz
1968
 2nd Polder-Kempen
 3rd Ronde van Limburg
 9th Omloop Het Volk
1969
 1st GP Stad Vilvoorde
 3rd Road race, National Road Championships
 5th Omloop van de Vlaamse Scheldeboorden
1970
 4th Grote Prijs Jef Scherens
1971
 4th Tour du Condroz
 5th De Kustpijl
 5th Nokere Koerse
 5th Circuit des XI Villes
 8th Grand Prix de Wallonie
1972
 8th Grand Prix Cerami
1973
 1st Omloop van het Leiedal
 6th Le Samyn
1974
 1st Omloop der Zennevallei
1975
 6th Ronde van Limburg
1976
 1st Omloop Schelde-Durme
 4th Overall Tour de Luxembourg
1st Stages 3 & 4
 7th Leeuwse Pijl
 8th GP du Tournaisis
1977
 1st Omloop van de Vlaamse Scheldeboorden
 1st Stage 3 Tour de Luxembourg
 1st Stages 2 & 4a Grand Prix du Midi Libre
 3rd Milano–Torino
 6th Ronde van Limburg
1978
 1st Omloop van de Vlaamse Scheldeboorden
 1st Stage 4 Étoile des Espoirs
 3rd GP Union Dortmund
 4th Overall Étoile de Bessèges
 5th Le Samyn
 5th Dwars door België
 7th Grote Prijs Jef Scherens
 9th Druivenkoers Overijse
1979
 6th Omloop van de Vlaamse Scheldeboorden

References

External links

1943 births
Living people
Belgian male cyclists
People from Geel
Cyclists from Antwerp Province